BT Business and Public Sector was a division of United Kingdom telecommunications company BT Group that provided fixed-line, mobile, broadband and IT services to businesses (predominantly small and medium-sized enterprises) and the public sector in the UK and Ireland. It bought many of its services from BT's other divisions: EE, BT Global Services, BT Wholesale and Openreach. It also sold other vendors' products and services such as the Avaya IP Office business telephone system.

In April 2018, Gavin Patterson, then BT Group's CEO, announced Wholesale and Ventures was to be combined with the group's Business and Public Sector division into a newly-formed division, BT Enterprise. It came after BT's decision to undertake a streamlining of its operations, in a bid to strengthen its offerings as a business.

Prior to its merger with Wholesale and Ventures, Business and Public Sector was formerly known as BT Business that was established alongside BT Consumer following a two-way split from former division, BT Retail in 2013 to allow BT to "better serve its customers and focus even more on delivering its strategic priorities". It took on the business operations of BT Retail that involved the merging of BT Business, BT Enterprises and BT Ireland while BT Wi-fi (part of BT Enterprises) and the consumer part of BT Ireland transferred to BT Consumer. It took on its current name following BT's new organisational structure that took effect in April 2016 after its acquisition of EE, and comprises the existing BT Business division along with EE's business division and those parts of BT Global Services that are UK focused.

Products

BT Business provides the following products as of 28 January 2016:

Voice
 Phone lines and featurelines
 Voice over IP (VoIP) services
 On-premises phone systems
 ISDN - provides high-performance voice and data services
 Conferencing - audio, web and video conferencing
 Business numbers
 Payphone services
 BT One Phone

Mobile

 Mobile phone contracts
 SIM-only contracts
 Tablet contracts
 BT One Phone

Broadband

 BT Broadband - provides standard broadband
 BT Infinity - provides fibre-optic broadband
 Mobile broadband - provides data allowance, hardware and tablet options
 BTnet Leased Lines - provides leased lines to access the internet

IT services

Networking
 Ethernet VPN
 Ethernet Point-to-Point (P2P) - extends LAN across local sites without compromising on performance or security
 IP Connect - connects multiple sites and/or simplifies communications to a single private IP VPN
 Managed WAN - connects your sites to each other on a virtual private network

Computing & Apps
 Microsoft Office 365 - a cloud-based version of Microsoft Office
 Enhanced IT Support - a 24/7 remote IT support service
 Web hosting - create and manage websites to be accessible via the World Wide Web
 Domain registration - provides the facility to purchase and manage domain names
 BT Buynet/SafePay - a payment reconciliation with real-time authorisation, daily settlement, and easy-to-understand reporting
 BT eShop - provides various tools for the creation and management of your own online shop

Bring Your Own Device
Bring Your Own Device (BYOD) allows employees to use their own devices.

BT PC Security
BT PC Security is a complete internet security and antivirus protection suite, in association with McAfee.

Cloud & Data Centre Solutions
Cloud & Data Centre Solutions provides a range of server technology, software and platforms.

See also 
BT Consumer

References

Telecommunications companies of the United Kingdom
Internet service providers of the United Kingdom
Companies established in 1981
BT Group